Peoria is an unincorporated community and a census-designated place (CDP) located in and governed by Arapahoe County, Colorado, United States. The CDP is a part of the Denver–Aurora–Lakewood, CO Metropolitan Statistical Area. The population of the Peoria CDP was 163 at the United States Census 2010. The Byers post office (ZIP code 80103) serves the area.

Geography

Demographics

See also

 Outline of Colorado
 Index of Colorado-related articles
 State of Colorado
 Colorado cities and towns
 Colorado census designated places
 Colorado counties
 Arapahoe County, Colorado
 Colorado metropolitan areas
 Front Range Urban Corridor
 North Central Colorado Urban Area
 Denver-Aurora-Boulder, CO Combined Statistical Area
 Denver-Aurora-Broomfield, CO Metropolitan Statistical Area

References

External links

Arapahoe County website

Census-designated places in Arapahoe County, Colorado
Census-designated places in Colorado
Denver metropolitan area